Thyrty is a 2003 30th anniversary album by American Southern rock band Lynyrd Skynyrd. It consists of a two-disc set, with the final ten tracks on disc two from the post-plane crash lineup. It was certified gold and platinum by the RIAA on February 21, 2005. As a limited edition, the album peaked at number 16 on the Billboard 200.
All tracks are full length remixed/remastered stereo studio versions.

Track listing

Disc 1
"Sweet Home Alabama" (Ed King, Gary Rossington, Ronnie Van Zant) – 4:45
"Need All My Friends" (Complete version) (Allen Collins, R. Van Zant) – 5:12
"Blues Medley" (B.B. King, Jules Taub, Jane Feather, Traditional) – 10:15 (Previously unreleased)
"Down South Jukin'" (Rossington, R. Van Zant) – 2:14
"Was I Right or Wrong?" (Rossington, R. Van Zant) – 5:24
"I Ain't the One" (Rossington, R. Van Zant) – 3:54
"Tuesday's Gone" (Collins, R. Van Zant) – 7:33
"Gimme Three Steps" (Collins, R. Van Zant) – 4:30
"Workin' for MCA" (King, R. Van Zant) – 4:47
"The Ballad of Curtis Loew" (Collins, R. Van Zant) – 4:51
"Call Me the Breeze" (J.J. Cale) – 5:08
"Saturday Night Special" (King, R. Van Zant) – 5:09
"All I Can Do Is Write About It" (Acoustic version) (Collins, R. Van Zant) – 4:24
"Free Bird" (Collins, Van Zant) – 9:10

Disc 2
"Whiskey Rock-A-Roller" (Live) (King, Billy Powell, R. Van Zant) – 4:12
"Simple Man" (Live) (Rossington, R. Van Zant) – 6:42
"What's Your Name?" (Rossington, R. Van Zant) – 3:33
"That Smell" (Collins, R. Van Zant) – 5:49
"I Know A Little" (Steve Gaines) – 3:28
"You Got That Right" (Gaines, R. Van Zant) – 3:47
"Comin' Home" (Live) (Collins, R. Van Zant) – 6:36
"Swamp Music" (Live) (King, R. Van Zant) – 3:51
"Gimme Back My Bullets" (Live) (Rossington, R. Van Zant) – 5:05
"Smokestack Lightning" (Rossington, King, Johnny Van Zant, Todd Cerney) – 4:29
"The Last Rebel" (Rossington, J. Van Zant, Robert White Johnson, Michael Lunn) – 6:46
"Things Goin' On" (Acoustic version) (Rossington, R. Van Zant) – 3:00
"Talked Myself Right Into It" (J. Van Zant, Donnie Van Zant, Johnson, Pat Buchanan) – 3:26
"We Ain't Much Different" (Live) (Rossington, J. Van Zant, Rickey Medlocke, Hughie Thomasson, Mike Estes) – 3:42
"Workin'" (Rossington, J. Van Zant, Medlocke, Thomasson) – 4:54
"Mad Hatter" (Rossington, J. Van Zant, Medlocke, Thomasson, Tom Hambridge) – 5:37

Disc 1, tracks 1 and 9–11 from Second Helping (1974)
Disc 1, track 2 from Collectybles (2000)
Disc 1, tracks 4–5 from Skynyrd's First and... Last (1978)
Disc 1, tracks 6–8 and 14 from (Pronounced 'Lĕh-'nérd 'Skin-'nérd) (1973)
Disc 1, track 12 from Nuthin' Fancy (1975)
Disc 1, track 13 from the Lynyrd Skynyrd Box Set (1991)
Disc 2, track 1 from One More from the Road (1976)
Disc 2, track 2 from Legend (1987)
Disc 2, tracks 3–6 from Street Survivors (1977)
Disc 2, tracks 7–9 from Southern by the Grace of God (1988)
Disc 2, track 10 from Lynyrd Skynyrd 1991 (1991)
Disc 2, track 11 from The Last Rebel (1993)
Disc 2, track 12 from Endangered Species (1994)
Disc 2, track 13 from Twenty (1997)
Disc 2, track 14 from Lyve from Steel Town (1998)
Disc 2, track 15 from Edge of Forever (1999)
Disc 2, track 16 from Vicious Cycle (2003)

Live songs
Disc 2, tracks 1–2 recorded 7/7/1976 at the Fox Theatre in Atlanta, GA
Disc 2, track 7 recorded 11/1/1987 at the Reunion Arena in Dallas, TX
Disc 2, track 8 recorded 10/23/1987 at the Starwood Amphitheatre in Antioch, TN
Disc 2, track 9 recorded 10/15/1987 at The Omni in Atlanta, GA (Mistakenly listed as 1997 in the booklet)
Disc 2, track 14 recorded 7/15/1997 at the Coca-Cola Star Lake Amphitheatre in Burgettstown, PA

Certifications

References

Lynyrd Skynyrd compilation albums
2003 compilation albums